The following is a list of vessels that have served in the Israeli Navy since 1948.

"INS" stands for "Israeli Navy Ship".

Missile corvettes

Missile boats

Submarines

Support ships

WW2 gunships

WW2 gunboats

Patrol boats

 Netz-class boats – Retired
 Yatush-class patrol boats – Retired
 Bertram-class patrol boats – Retired
 Saar 1-class boats – based on German Jaguar-class fast attack craft, built in France
  – Converted to Saar 2 class missile boat
  – Converted to Saar 2 class missile boat
  – Converted to Saar 2 class missile boat
 Dabur-class patrol boats – 12 built by Sewart Seacraft, the rest by IAI-Ramta – 34 adopted in 1973–77, decommissioned)
 Super Dvora-class fast patrol boats – built by IAI-Ramta
 Dvora Mk I - 9 adopted from 1988, 9 active
 Super Dvora Mk II - 4 adopted from 1996, 2 active
 Super Dvora Mk III - 7 active 
 Shaldag-class fast patrol boats
Shaldag Mk I - 5 active
 Shaldag Mk II - 2 active
 Tzir'ah-class patrol boats – 3 active

Hydrofoils
 Grumman M161 hydrofoil
 INS Shimrit (Built by Grumman)
 INS Shlomit (Built in Israel) Sold for scrap in September 1991.

Landing ships
 P-25, P-33 – built in Germany
 Purchased in Italy
 Commissioned in 1948
 Retired in 1957
 P-31
 Purchased in Italy
 Commissioned in August 1948
 Retired after a brief service
LCT class
 INS Gush Etsion / Prato (P-39)
 Purchased in Italy
 Commissioned in July 1948
 Retired in 1957
LCI class
 , 
 Commissioned in December 1948 / January 1949
 Retired in late 1950s

 Purchased in 1968-69
 Retired in the 1990s, sunk during a missile trials
LSM-1 class
 Purchased in 1970
 Retired in 1973-74
Kishon class landing ships – built in Israel
Retired by 1991
Ashdod class landing ships – built in Israel in 1966-67
 
 Retired in 2001
 , 
 Retired in 1999

Commando boats
Dolphin type underwater craft
Maiale (pig) type underwater craft
Snunit boats
Zaharon boats
Moulit boats
Morena rigid-hulled inflatable boats

References

External links

Official website 
Israeli Sea Corps Legacy website 
World Navies Today: Israel
HNSA Ship Page: INS Mivtach
HNSA Ship Page: INS Af Al Pi Chen
Aliyah Bet project: Ships

Ships of the Israeli Sea Corps
Ships of the Israeli Navy
Israeli Navy